Issa Ali Abdullah al Murbati is a citizen of Bahrain who was held in extrajudicial detention in the United States Guantanamo Bay detainment camps, in Cuba. 
Al Murbati's Guantanamo Internment Serial Number was 52.
American counter-terrorism analysts estimate he was born in 1965, in Manama, Bahrain.

Detention in Kandahar

While held at Kandahar Airfield, al-Murbati and Moazzam Begg began playing chess on a board the International Red Cross had brought for the detainees.

Al Murbati participated in the hunger strikes of 2005.

Allegations
The allegations against Al Murbati, from the Summary of Evidence memo, prepared for his Combatant Status Review Tribunal, were:

Habeas corpus submission

Al Murbati is one of the sixteen Guantanamo captives whose amalgamated habeas corpus submissions were heard by
US District Court Judge Reggie B. Walton, on January 31, 2007.

Al Murbati has been represented by Joshua Colangelo-Bryan and Clive Stafford Smith.
A campaign to free him is being led by Bahraini MP Mohammed Khalid.

Release

Al Murbati was released during August 2007.  He was the last Bahraini to be released.
On Thursday, August 23, 2007, the Gulf Daily News reported that 
Bahraini Member of Parliament Mohammed Khalid had called for the Bahrain government to provide financial compensation to the released men.

See also
Solitary confinement
Juma Mohammed Al Dossary
Salah Abdul Rasool Al Blooshi
Adel Kamel Hajee
Shaikh Salman Ebrahim Mohamed Ali Al Khalifa
Abdulla Majid Al Naimi

References

External links

 Isa al-Murbati, the last Bahraini in Guantánamo, returns home (and a former Taliban minister returns to Afghanistan) Andy Worthington
 Bushehri,Shereen Bahrain Urged to Stand Up for Rights of Citizens in Guantanamo Arab News February 6, 2005
 Forced feeding at Guantanamo is now acknowledged, New York Times, 22 February 2006

1965 births
Living people
People from Manama
Guantanamo detainees known to have been released
Bahraini extrajudicial prisoners of the United States